Hussein Farey was the first democratically elected governor of the Gedo administrative region. His admission occurred in a grassroots effort with inauguration into office in 2008.

References

Living people
Government ministers of Somalia
Year of birth missing (living people)
People from Gedo